Eriogonum hookeri is a species of wild buckwheat known by the common name Hooker's buckwheat. It is native to the Intermountain West of the United States, where it grows in plateau and desert habitat.

Description
It is an annual herb producing an erect stem surrounded at the base with a small patch of round, woolly leaves.  The branched flowering stem is hairless and waxy in texture.  It spreads into an inflorescence lined with many small dangling clusters of yellow to reddish flowers, each individual flower just a few millimeters wide.

External links
 Jepson Manual Treatment - Eriogonum hookeri
 Eriogonum hookeri - Photo gallery

hookeri
Flora of the Northwestern United States
Flora of the Southwestern United States
Flora of the California desert regions
Flora without expected TNC conservation status